AZ-12216052 is a drug which acts as a potent and selective positive allosteric modulator of the metabotropic glutamate receptor 8, and is used for research into the role of this receptor subtype in various processes including anxiety and neuropathic pain.

References 

MGlu8 receptor agonists
Bromoarenes
Thioethers
Amides